Tank blanketing, also referred to as tank padding, is the process of applying a gas to the empty space in a storage container. The term storage container here refers to any container that is used to store products, regardless of its size. Though tank blanketing is used for a variety of reasons, it typically involves using a buffer gas to protect products inside the storage container. A few of the benefits of blanketing include a longer life of the product in the container, reduced hazards, and longer equipment life cycles.

Methods
In 1970, Appalachian Controls Environmental (ACE) was the world’s first company to introduce a tank blanketing valve. There are now many ready-made systems available for purchase from a variety of process equipment companies. It is also possible to piece together your own system using a variety of different equipment. Regardless of which method is used, the basic requirements are the same.  There must be a way of allowing the blanketing gas into the system, and a way to vent the gas should the pressure get too high.

Since ACE introduced its valve many companies have engineered their own versions. Though many of the products available vary in features and applicability, the fundamental design is the same. When the pressure inside the container drops below a set point, a valve opens and allows the blanketing gas to enter. Once the pressure reaches the set point, the valve closes. As a safety feature, many systems include a pressure vent that opens when the pressure inside exceeds a maximum pressure set point.  This helps to prevent the container from rupturing due to high pressure. Since most blanketing gas sources will provide gas at a much higher than desired pressure, a blanketing system will also use a pressure reducing valve to decrease the inlet pressure to the tank.

Although it varies from application to application, blanketing systems usually operate at a slightly higher than atmospheric pressure (a few inches of water column above atmospheric). Higher pressures than this are generally not used as they often yield only marginal increases in results while wasting large amounts of expensive blanketing gas.

Some systems also utilize inert gases to agitate the liquid contents of the container. This is desirable because products, such as citric acid, are added to food oils the tank will begin to settle over time with the heavier contents sinking to the bottom. However, a system that utilizes nitrogen sparging (and then subsequently tank blanketing once the nitrogen reaches the vapor space) may have negative impact on the products involved. Nitrogen sparging creates a significantly higher amount of surface contact between the gas and the product, which in turn creates a much larger opportunity for undesired oxidation to occur. It is possible for nitrogen that is as much 99.9% free of oxygen to increase the amount of oxidation within the product due to the high amount of surface contact.

Common practices
The most common gas used in blanketing is nitrogen. Nitrogen is widely used due to its inert properties, as well as its availability and relatively low cost. Tank blanketing is used for a variety of products including cooking oils, volatile combustible products, and purified water. These applications also cover a wide variety of storage containers, ranging from as large as a tank containing millions of gallons of vegetable oil down to a quart-size container or smaller. Nitrogen is appropriate for use at any of these scales.

The use of an inert blanketing gas for food products helps to keep oxygen levels low in and around the product. Low levels of oxygen surrounding the product help to reduce the amount of oxidation that may occur, and increases shelf life.  In the case of cooking oils, lipid oxidation can cause the oil to change its color, flavor, or aroma. It also decreases the nutrient levels in the food and can even generate toxic substances. Tank blanketing strategies are also implemented to prepare the product for transit (railcar or truck) and for final packaging before sealing the product.

When considering the application for combustible products, the greatest benefit is process safety. Since fuels require oxygen to combust, reduced oxygen content in the vapor space lowers the risk of unwanted combustion.

Tank blanketing is also used to keep contaminants out of a storage space. This is accomplished by creating positive pressure inside the container. This positive pressure ensures that if a leak should occur, the gas will leak out rather than having the contaminants infiltrate the container. Some examples include its use on purified water to keep unwanted minerals out and its use on food products to keep contaminants out.

To ensure their safety, gas-blanketing systems for food use are regulated by the U.S. Food and Drug Administration (FDA) and must adhere to strict maintenance schedules and follow all product-contact regulations with regards to purity, toxicity, and filter specs. As with any use of inert gases, care must be taken to ensure that workers are not exposed to large quantities of nitrogen or other non-breathable substances, which can quickly result in asphyxiation and death. Use of them in commercial applications is subject to the regulation of OSHA in the USA and similar regulatory bodies elsewhere.

See also
Industrial gas
Oxygen reduction system
Inerting system

References

Author unavailable (2000), Fisher Controls becomes an “ACE” in tank blanketing [Electronic version]. Control Engineering Europe, July 2000, 12.

Kanner, J., Rosenthal, I. (1992), An Assessment of Lipid Oxidation in Foods [Electronic version]. Pure Appl. Chem., Vol. 64, No. 12, 1959-1964. Retrieved February 15, 2007, from http://www.iupac.org/publications/pac/1992/pdf/6412x1959.pdf

Amos, Kenna (1999). Leakless vapor-space valve controls unveiled. InTech, January 1999. Retrieved February 15, 2007, from http://findarticles.com/p/articles/mi_qa3739/is_199901/ai_n8840650

External sources
Online Chemical Engineering Information
Nitrogen properties, uses, and applications

Control engineering
Chemical processes